Lengenfeld is a town in the Vogtlandkreis district, in the Free State of Saxony in eastern Germany. The town is situated 19 km southwest of Zwickau, and 18 km northeast of Plauen.

History 

During World War II, in the town, Germany operated a forced labour subcamp of the Nazi prison in Zwickau, and a subcamp of the Flossenbürg concentration camp. About 1,000 prisoners, half of whom were deported from German-occupied Poland, a quarter from the Soviet Union, and the remainder were mostly Jews from various other countries, were imprisoned as forced labour in the latter. 246 prisoners died in the subcamp, and were mostly cremated in nearby Reichenbach im Vogtland, and the remaining were evacuated in a death march, during which many also died.

References

Vogtlandkreis